The Sumy trolleybus system forms part of the public transport network serving Sumy, in Sumy Oblast, Ukraine.

The owner of the trolleybus network is the Sumy city council, the passenger transportation is provided by KP SMR "Elektroavtotrans" (Sumyelektroavtotrans).

The trolleybus system in Sumy is one of the main types of public transport, covering both the central part and some remote neighborhoods.

History

Trolleybus traffic in Sumy was opened on August 25, 1967. The first city trolleybus was "Khimmistechko – Railway Terminal". At the opening there were 25 used MTB-82 trolleybuses from Moscow and 10 new Kyiv-4 trolleybuses.

During the period from the day of opening of trolleybus traffic through the present time the enterprise was headed by 16 directors, from them O. F. Ivanov worked the most, for a period of 11 years (1987–1998).

Inventory number of trolleybuses in Sumy:

 1980 — 128 (84 working).
 1985 — 127 (88 working).
 1990 — 145 (101 working).
 2010 — 69 (52 working).
 2015 — 68 (65 working).
 2016 — 68 (60 working).
 2017 — 68 (54 working).
 2018 — 69 (59 working).
 2019 — 73 (64 working).

In the crisis of 1990 Sumy managed to preserve the Sumy trolleybus network as a whole, but since 1991 no trolleybuses have been overhauled, and repair work has been carried out only to restore the hull and chassis. Given that half of the trolleybuses have a service life of 20–28 years, the condition of electrical equipment in Sumy is a matter of serious concern.

In 2009–2010, the company carried out purposeful work to stabilize the trolleybus fleet. Along with the optimization of the production process, the company has achieved that in 2009 to early 2010 there were 46–48 trolleybuses (in 2008 this figure was 38–30) on the line daily, of which due to breakdowns in the depot returns only 5–6 instead of 10–12 against last year's figures. The rolling stock use ratio at Sumyelektroavtotrans (according to its director) is one of the best in Ukraine.

Material and technical base and reorganization of the repair service allows Sumyelektroavtotrans to independently carry out medium and major repairs of trolleybuses, including electrical equipment. Currently, Sumyelektroavtotrans has developed a system of capital and medium repairs, taking into account the replacement of electrical wiring, or its restoration, where it is economically feasible.

From 2010 to 2015, 8 cars managed to pass the CWR. There were no purchases of the new RS in 2011–2014.

In 2015, Sumyelektroavtotrans purchased 12 Bogdan T70117 trolleybuses.

On January 25, 2020, Oleksandr Perchakov, director of the organization that operates the Sumy trolleybus network, Sumyelektroavtotrans, retired. There is currently a competition for the vacant position.

On March 12, 2020, a new director, Vitaliy Odnorog, was appointed. Also in 2020, the company received a license for the right to train trolleybus drivers.

In December 2021, KP "Elektroavtotrans" received 10 new trolleybuses, those same ones who waited until October 25 and because of which the local authorities even had to "fight" with the plant. At the request of the mayor, they were registered and released on the line. This acquisition made it possible to launch a new ring route - trolleybus No. 21.

Fare

In 2016, the cost of a single trip was ₴1.25.

Following January 1, 2017, the cost of a single trip was ₴1.75.

And after April 1, 2017, the cost of a single trip was ₴2.00.

Following February 1, 2018, the fare was ₴2.50.

As of February 1, 2019, the fare is ₴4 (for schoolchildren and students ₴2).

Routes 

List of trolleybus lines.

Former routes

Former lines, not currently in service.

Rolling stock

In November 2010, there were 69 trolleybuses and 5 new buses on the balance sheet of Sumielektroavtotrans. Of these, a "certified" 32 can go to active service, 20 need medium repair, and 18 need overhaul repair. According to Director Victor Chaly, presented at a meeting at the Sumy City Hall, 38 trolleybuses need medium and overhaul.

At the end of 2015, there were 68 trolleybuses and 20 buses in the Sumielektroavtotrans Depot.

The company also began to repair its rolling stock, although the cars were still undergoing KR / KVR. On December 19, 2014, the trolleybuses allegedly of their own production with depot numbers 284 (which since the summer of 2010 was not operated) with the nominal name "Sumchanin-2014", and number 257 under the name "Volunteer" were equipped with Wi-Fi as well as later in trolleybuses 080, 081, 072, 074, 005. Trolleybus number 236 is currently under repair.

On April 26, 2018, the first of four Etalon Т12110 «Barvinok» Trolleybuses arrived in Sumy.

Current fleet

Service fleet

Replenishment of rolling stock with new trolleybuses per year

Perspectives

In the framework of the project "Urban Public Transport in Ukraine" at the expense of borrowed funds from the European Investment Bank under state guarantees it is planned to purchase 22 trolleybuses worth 4 million euros.

See also

List of trolleybus systems in Ukraine

External links
 Sumy // Local electric transport
 eway Map of marshrutkas, buses, and trolleybuses of Sumy // EasyWay
 Sumy trolleybus // Transport portal of Sumy
 transitmap // Unofficial map of Sumy transport network

References

Trolleybus transport in Ukraine
Sumy
Sumy
Sumy